Charles Henry Pierce (February 22, 1875 – March 2, 1944) was a Private in the United States Army and a Medal of Honor recipient for his actions in the Philippine–American War.

He is buried at Valhalla Memorial Park Cemetery in North Hollywood, California.

Medal of Honor citation
Rank and organization: Private, Company I, 22d U.S. Infantry. Place and date: Near San Isidro, Luzon, Philippine Islands, October 19, 1899. Entered service at: Delaware City, Del. Birth: Cecil County, Md. Date of issue: March 10, 1902.

Citation:

Held a bridge against a superior force of the enemy and fought, though severely wounded, until the main body came up to cross.

See also

List of Medal of Honor recipients
List of Philippine–American War Medal of Honor recipients

References

External links
 

1875 births
1944 deaths
United States Army Medal of Honor recipients
United States Army soldiers
American military personnel of the Philippine–American War
People from Cecil County, Maryland
Philippine–American War recipients of the Medal of Honor